Brachydeiroidea is a superfamily of small to moderately large-sized arthrodire placoderms from the Late Devonian of Europe and Eastern North America.

Brachydeiroids have, in cross section, a highly compressed body, a pointed, sometimes highly elongated snout, and tremendous orbits.  The plates of the trunk shield are noticeably shortened: in Synauchenia, the trunk shield and head shield are fused together as a single, immovable unit.  The superficial anatomy of brachydeiroids is extremely diverse.

Families

Brachydeiridae
A diverse family of variable forms, restricted to the middle to late Frasnian of Europe.

Leptosteidae
This family is represented by two species in the genus Leptosteus.  Leptosteids differ from brachydeirids by having comparatively smaller orbits and more elongated trunk shields.

See also

List of placoderms

References